Gordey Alekseevich Kosenko (born 3 January 1989) is a Russian badminton player.

Achievements

BWF International Challenge/Series (3 runners-up) 
Men's doubles

  BWF International Challenge tournament
  BWF International Series tournament
  BWF Future Series tournament

References

External links 
 

1989 births
Living people
Russian male badminton players